CCIM is an abbreviation that may refer to:

 Certified Commercial Investment Member, a recognized expert in the disciplines of commercial and investment real estate
 Central Council of Indian Medicine, a statutory body in India
 A former reporting mark of Corpus Christi Terminal Railroad